Jon Ehrlich is a television and film composer. He is known for his collaborations with Jason Derlatka. He wrote the music of the Fox television series House and the NBC comedy-drama Parenthood. He is also known for his works on the ABC's television series Invasion which received critical acclaim.

Filmography

Award nominations

References

External links
 

Place of birth missing (living people)
Living people
American film score composers
American male film score composers
American television composers
Year of birth missing (living people)